Amphinema is a genus of cnidarians belonging to the family Pandeidae.

The genus has cosmopolitan distribution.

Species:

Amphinema australis 
Amphinema biscayana 
Amphinema bouilloni 
Amphinema calcariformis 
Amphinema cheshirei 
Amphinema dinema 
Amphinema globogona 
Amphinema gordini 
Amphinema krampi 
Amphinema modernisme 
Amphinema nanhainensis 
Amphinema physophorum 
Amphinema platyhedos 
Amphinema rollinsi 
Amphinema rubrum 
Amphinema rugosum 
Amphinema tsingtauensis

References

Pandeidae
Hydrozoan genera